Saša Vujanić (born January 23, 1979) is a Yugoslav sprint canoer who competed in the early 2000s. At the 2000 Summer Olympics in Sydney, he finished ninth in the K-4 1000 m event. Formerly a science teacher, he is now working as a mathematics teacher at port hacking high.

References
 Sports-Reference.com profile

1979 births
Canoeists at the 2000 Summer Olympics
Living people
Olympic canoeists of Yugoslavia
Yugoslav male canoeists
Serbian male canoeists